Harold John Haering, Sr. (December 27, 1930 – May 5, 2014) was an American politician from Louisville, Kentucky.

Haering received his degree in history from Xavier University. He then taught elementary school and was in the real estate and home building business. He served in the Kentucky House of Representatives and then served in the Kentucky State Senate from 1983 to 1988 as a Republican.

Notes

1930 births
2014 deaths
Politicians from Louisville, Kentucky
Xavier University alumni
Businesspeople from Kentucky
Republican Party members of the Kentucky House of Representatives
Republican Party Kentucky state senators
20th-century American businesspeople